The Adolph J. Zang House, also referred to as the Gargoyle House, is a National Register of Historic Places-listed residence in Denver, Colorado. It is located at 1532 Emerson Street. William Lang was the architect. It was constructed in a Gothic architecture/ Romanesque architecture style. It has also been described as Late Victorian eclecticism with elements of Chateauesque, Gothic, and Richardsonian Romanesque architecture. It remains largely intact.

Adolph Zang (14 August 1856 - 28 September 1916) was the son of Philip Zang (15 February 1826 - 18 February 1899), the founder of Zang Brewery. Adolph Zang worked in the brewery business and had mining and real estate interests.

See also
Adolph Zang Mansion, also NRHP-listed in Denver

References

Houses on the National Register of Historic Places in Colorado
Gothic Revival architecture in Colorado
Romanesque Revival architecture in Colorado
Houses in Denver
National Register of Historic Places in Denver